Oedura fimbria, also called the western marbled velvet gecko, is a species of geckos endemic to Western Australia.

References

Oedura
Geckos of Australia
Reptiles described in 2016
Taxa named by Paul M. Oliver
Taxa named by Paul Doughty